Jaak Prints (born Jaak Teppart; 7 May 1981) is an Estonian actor, director, television presenter and former footballer.

Prints was born in Tallinn to actors Sulev Teppart and Anu Lamp. His younger brother Tõnn Lamp is also an actor. In 2004, he graduated from Estonian Academy of Music and Theatre in acting speciality.

2004-2005 he was an actor at Vanemuine Theatre. 2005–2012, he was an actor at Theatre NO99.

He has also been a footballer. His last club was JK Viimsi II. Since 2018, he has been a lecturer and the chief coordinator of the Department of Drama of the Estonian Academy of Music and Theatre.

In 2021, he was awarded with Order of the White Star, IV class.

References

1981 births
Living people
21st-century Estonian male actors
Estonian male stage actors
Estonian male television actors
Estonian male film actors
Estonian male child actors
Estonian theatre directors
Estonian television presenters
Estonian footballers
Recipients of the Order of the White Star, 4th Class
Estonian Academy of Music and Theatre alumni
Academic staff of the Estonian Academy of Music and Theatre
People from Tallinn
Association footballers not categorized by position